Gustaf Vilhelm Carlberg (5 April 1880 – 1 October 1970) was a Swedish Army officer and sports shooter. He competed at the 1908, 1912 and 1924 Olympics and won three gold and four silver. With three gold and two silver medals he was the most successful athlete at the 1912 Olympics. In 1913, he won two medals at the ISSF World Shooting Championships. His twin brother Eric competed alongside Gustaf at all those four Olympics.

Vilhelm and Eric were the youngest of four children of a veterinarian, who died when they were 12 years old. The twins became military officers in 1901 and retired in the rank of major. In 1911 they became physical education instructors. Besides shooting, Vilhelm was a keen gymnast, who took part in the exhibition at the 1906 Olympics and helped organizing gymnastics events at the 1912 Games. In 1921 Vilhelm married the singer Elsa Reuter.

References

1880 births
1970 deaths
Swedish Army officers
Swedish twins
People from Karlskrona
Swedish male sport shooters
ISSF rifle shooters
ISSF pistol shooters
Shooters at the 1906 Intercalated Games
Shooters at the 1908 Summer Olympics
Shooters at the 1912 Summer Olympics
Shooters at the 1924 Summer Olympics
Olympic shooters of Sweden
Olympic gold medalists for Sweden
Olympic silver medalists for Sweden
Olympic medalists in shooting
Medalists at the 1906 Intercalated Games
Medalists at the 1908 Summer Olympics
Medalists at the 1912 Summer Olympics
Medalists at the 1924 Summer Olympics
Sportspeople from Blekinge County